R617 road may refer to:
 R617 road (Ireland)
 R617 (South Africa)